The 1986 King of the Ring was the second annual King of the Ring professional wrestling tournament produced by the World Wrestling Federation (WWF, now WWE). The tournament was held on July 14, 1986 at the Sullivan Stadium in Foxborough, Massachusetts as a special non-televised house show. The 1986 tournament was won by Harley Race.

In the tournament, there were two other matches. Prior to the final match of the King of the Ring tournament, Bruno Sammartino defeated The Designated Hitman (a substitute for Eddie Andelmann, a local TV/radio personality who refused to wrestle). Following the finale match of the king of the rings, The British Bulldogs (Davey Boy Smith and The Dynamite Kid) defeated The Dream Team (Greg Valentine and Brutus Beefcake) (with Johnny V.) in a steel cage match to retain the WWF Tag Team Championship. Dynamite and Beefcake escaped from the cage first. Smith then escaped the cage to win the match after Valentine had accidentally knocked him out with a kick.

Production

Background
In 1985, the World Wrestling Federation (WWF, now WWE) established the King of the Ring tournament, which was a single-elimination tournament where the winner was crowned the "King of the Ring." The 1986 tournament was the second King of the Ring tournament, establishing the tournament as an annual event. It was held on July 14, 1986 at the Sullivan Stadium in Foxborough, Massachusetts and like the previous year, it was a special non-televised house show.

Storylines
The matches resulted from scripted storylines, where wrestlers portrayed heroes, villains, or less distinguishable characters in scripted events that built tension and culminated in a wrestling match or series of matches. Results were predetermined by World Wrestling Federation's writers.

Event
During the first round of the tournament, there was a total of six matches. Billy Jack Haynes pinned The Iron Sheik after a small package Harley Race beat George Steele by disqualification after Steele rammed Race into one of the golf carts at ringside. Don Muraco and Roddy Piper wrestled to a twenty minute time limit draw. Nikolai Volkoff pinned Dan Spivey. Junkyard Dog beat Paul Orndorff by disqualification for attacking the Referee. Pedro Morales pinned Rudy Diamond who was substituting for Bob Orton.

During the quarterfinal round of the tournament, there were three matches. Harley Race received a bye due to the Muraco and Piper match reaching the time limit in the first round. Billy Jack Haynes beat Mr. X with a full nelson. Mr X was a substitute for Hercules Hernandez. Nikolai Volkoff beat Junkyard Dog after Dog submitted to a bearhug. In the final quarterfinal match, Pedro Morales pinned Mike Rotunda after Rotunda performed a back suplex From The Top Rope on Morales but Rotunda's shoulders were on the mat.

During the first match of the semifinals, Race beat Haynes, when Haynes was counted out while Haynes applied the full nelson on Race while on the outside of the ring on the apron. Pedro Morales beat Nikolai Volkoff after Morales broke free and reversed a bearhug into a small package for the pin.  

In the final Race pinned Morales after he superplexed Morales back into the ring.

Aftermath
Following the event, Race began referring to himself as "King" Harley Race, approaching the ring in a crown and cape, to the ceremonial accompaniment of the Tenth Movement (known as "The Great Gates of Kiev") of Pictures at an Exhibition by Modest Mussorgsky. After winning a match, Race would command his defeated opponent to bow and kneel before him; his manager, Bobby Heenan, would assist by grabbing the opponent's hair and forcing them to bow before Race.

Results

Tournament bracket 

1.  Rudy Diamond was a substitute for Bob Orton.
2.  Mr. X was a substitute for Hercules Hernandez

References

1986
1985 in professional wrestling
1986 in Massachusetts
Events in Foxborough, Massachusetts
Professional wrestling in Massachusetts
July 1986 events in the United States
Sports competitions in Foxborough, Massachusetts